Tel Aviv Metro (also MetroTLV) is a planned subway system for the Tel Aviv Metropolitan Area. It will augment the Tel Aviv Light Rail and Israel Railways suburban lines and consist of three underground metro lines to form a rapid transit transportation solution for the city.

Construction is expected to start in 2025, with the first public opening in 2032. The legal foundation for building the metro is found in National Outline Plan 70.

History
The plan for the metro was born in 2015 in the Israeli ministry of finance, bypassing the transportation ministry. The ministry's rationale was that the light rail plan would not be sufficient to answer Tel Aviv's transportation needs as early as the 2020s, when the first lines would be completed. Multiple alternatives were proposed in internal discussions. At the time, the plan was met with surprise at the transportation ministry.

By early 2016 the two ministries agreed on a general outline that would include three of the seven planned light rail lines, in addition to three new metro lines. In September 2016, the government-owned company NTA (Hebrew acronym for Urban Transportation Lines) released a feasibility study tender for the metro lines. The final cost of all lines is estimated at NIS 130–150 billion (USD – billion).

In July 2018, NTA published a tender for the planning of the three subway lines. In July 2018, McKinsey submitted a report on the financial aspects of the project to the Israeli government. The architects chosen to head the planning teams are Data Kehat from Mansfeld–Kehat for M1, Eliezer Armon for M2 and Edna Lerman for M3.

On the April 15, 2019 the National Infrastructures Committee approved the route of all three metro lines.

In December 2022, trial excavation to assess the ground conditions to be encountered during the construction of the metro began.

Plan
Construction is slated to start around 2024–2026.

Costs
The projected cost of the scheme is ILS 150 billion, of which ILS 82 billion would go to the two lines labeled M1, including value added tax.

Within M1, the cost of moving infrastructure would cost ILS 2.5 billion. The 55 stations would cost ILS 19 billion, or approximately US $100 million per station. Tunneling would cost ILS 13 billion, systems would cost ILS 5 billion, and rolling stock – ILS 2.5 billion.

References

External links
 
 Map of all lines from NTA, 2020
 Schematic map of all lines from NTA, 2020
 Map of all lines from NTA, 2019

Proposed rail infrastructure in Israel
Underground rapid transit in Israel
Transport in Tel Aviv
Proposed rapid transit